The 2019 Inter-Provincial Championship, known for sponsorship reasons as the Test Triangle Inter-Provincial Championship, was the seventh edition of the Inter-Provincial Championship, a first-class cricket competition played in Ireland. It took place from 28 May to 29 August 2019. It was the third edition of the competition to be played with first-class status. North West Warriors were the defending champions.

The tournament was heavily affected by rain, with none of the games being completed. Only six days of play across the eighteen that were scheduled took place. Leinster Lightning were the eventual winners of the tournament.

Points table

 Champions

Fixtures

1st match

2nd match

3rd match

4th match

5th match

6th match

References

External links
 Series home at ESPN Cricinfo

Inter
Inter-Provincial Championship seasons